Evensong was the second album released by the band Amazing Blondel. It featured the style of music which they described as "pseudo-Elizabethan/Classical acoustic music sung with British accents".

By this time, the band were touring Britain extensively as part of a package of artists supporting major bands such as Free, and their contrasting style coupled with bawdy anecdotes between songs found favour with rock audiences.

The gatefold album cover shows the band in the cloisters of Lincoln Cathedral holding period instruments, while the interior lists credits and lyrics for the songs surrounding a photograph of the band in performance.

Track listing
All songs credited to Gladwin, except where specified.

Personnel
John David Gladwin - lead vocals, lute, theorboe, cittern, double bass
Terence Alan Wincott - crumhorn, recorders, pipe-organ, vocals (and occasional lead vocals), tabor pipe, tabor, flute, harmonium, lute, harpsichord
Edward Baird - lute, cittern, vocals (and very occasional lead vocals)
Chris Karan - percussion
Adam Skeaping - viola da gamba, violone

References

1970 albums
Amazing Blondel albums
Island Records albums
Albums produced by Paul Samwell-Smith